Erin Lordan (8 November 1963 – 26 February 2005) was a British singer and dancer who had hits in the UK with BBG, Bamboo, Ascension and Shut Up and Dance. She was a member of the dance troupe Hot Gossip. Erin was also "The Bride" in the Elton John video "Kiss the Bride". Lordan died of cancer on 26 February 2005.

Discography
"The Art of Moving Butts" (with Shut Up and Dance, 1992) - UK #69
"Let the Music Play" (with BBG, 1996) - UK #46
"The Strutt" (with Bamboo, 1998) - UK #36
"For a Lifetime" (with Ascension, 2002) - UK #45

References

1963 births
2005 deaths
English female dancers
British dance musicians
20th-century English singers
20th-century English women singers
Deaths from cancer in England